Zarmihr Karen (died 558) was an Iranian nobleman from the House of Karen, who served as the Sasanian governor of Zabulistan. He was the son of Sukhra.

Sources 
 

6th-century Iranian people
558 deaths
Year of birth unknown
House of Karen
Generals of Khosrow I